Nichole Lorraine Overall is an Australian politician. She was elected to the New South Wales Legislative Assembly at the 2022 Monaro state by-election.

Overall studied communications at the University of Canberra before working as a journalist for the Tumut and Adelong Times. She later ran a business in Queanbeyan. Her husband, Tim Overall, was a long-serving councillor and mayor on Queanbeyan City Council. In 2021 she was chosen as the National Party candidate for the Monaro by-election caused by party leader John Barilaro's resignation. She won the by-election on 12 February 2022.

References

Living people
National Party of Australia members of the Parliament of New South Wales
Members of the New South Wales Legislative Assembly
Place of birth missing (living people)
21st-century Australian politicians
Women members of the New South Wales Legislative Assembly
1972 births
21st-century Australian women politicians